Porocara is a genus of beetles in the family Carabidae, containing the following species:

 Porocara glabrata Baehr
 Porocara nigricollis Baehr
 Porocara occidentalis Baehr
 Porocara punctata Sloane
 Porocara ulrichi Baehr
Porocara deiru Baehr

References

Lebiinae